Preah Vihear is the capital of Preah Vihear province in northern Cambodia. Phnom Tbeng Meanchey is the mountain rising to 600m 5 km south-west of Tbeng Meanchey town.

References

 

Provincial capitals in Cambodia
Towns in Cambodia
Populated places in Preah Vihear province